José Eleazar Gómez Sánchez (better known as Eleazar Gómez born May 29, 1986, in Mexico City, Mexico) is a Mexican actor. He is noted for his performance in Mexican telenovelas. Gómez is the brother of actress Zoraida Gómez, Alizair Gomez and actor Jairo Gómez. He is a member of the Mexican pop band Eme 15.

Personal life
On November 6, 2020, Gómez was arrested and accused of domestic violence. As a consequence of this arrest, he was dropped by his talent agency and his character in La mexicana y el güero was recast, with Ferdinando Valencia replacing him. Gómez was freed on March 26, 2021, after he pleaded guilty of domestic violence charges and was fined with 420,000 pesos and a three-year parole period.

Filmography

Film roles

Television roles

References

External links

1986 births
Living people
Mexican male singers
Mexican male child actors
Mexican male telenovela actors
Eme 15 members
Male actors from Mexico City
Singers from Mexico City